The Nissan C80 was a medium-duty cabover truck manufactured by the Japanese automaker Nissan. The 3.5 ton C80 was introduced in 1966 to fill the gap between the 2 ton Nissan Caball and the 5 ton Nissan 680. Like the Caball, the C80 was a cab forward truck, shared with the Nissan Civilian. Two engines were available: the 3.0L H30 inline-6 that produced 120 horsepower, or the SD33 inline-6 diesel that produced 98 horsepower. The transmission was a column-shift 4-speed manual, but a 5-speed was offered as an option. There were no significant changes made to the C80 while in production when it was discontinued in 1976. It was exclusive to Japanese Nissan dealerships called Nissan Bluebird Store.

External links

C80
Medium trucks
Cab over vehicles
Vehicles introduced in 1966